Norbiton Railway Station is a railway station located in Norbiton, a suburb in the Royal Borough of Kingston upon Thames, in southwest London. The station and all trains serving it are operated by South Western Railway. It is in Travelcard Zone 5 and is a short walk from Kingston Hospital. It is also the most convenient station for the Kingsmeadow football ground.

History
Coaching interests in Kingston were opposed to having a railway in the town and consequently, the London and South Western Railway built its line to Southampton further south through Surbiton.  This opposition continued even during the laying of the line from Twickenham although this line did reach a terminus in Kingston in 1863. In 1869 the line was extended through Norbiton to connect to the central line southwest of the present  station.

When Queen Victoria visited distinguished residents in the Coombe Hill area, the royal train stopped at Norbiton, the only station in the area where the platform is at ground level. New Malden and Kingston have many steps.
It is the only remaining Victorian railway architecture in the Royal Borough of Kingston upon Thames.

Station facilities
In February and March 2012 a secure, swipe-card accessible cycle park for 50 cycles was built on Platform 1 replacing the previous set of shelters and bike racks

In August 2009 the platforms were fenced with high steel railings before the installation of ticket barriers. In 2011 the single-width 'off-peak' gated exit from platform 2 was doubled in width to cope with the large numbers of passengers leaving the station when the barriers are not operational. In 2014 the gated exit was widened again.

During the autumn of 2014, platforms 1 and 2 were raised and the edges reconstructed to reduce the step and gap for passengers getting on and off the trains. Earlier in 2014, the platforms were extended in preparation for longer trains.

There is a 38-space car park and space for 5 vehicles reserved for South Western Railway staff.

Platforms 

Norbiton station has two platforms.

Platform 1 – Trains to London Waterloo via Wimbledon.
Platform 2 – Trains to London Waterloo via Kingston & Richmond and trains to Shepperton.

Services 
The typical off-peak service at the station in trains per hour is:

 6 to London Waterloo, of which:
 4 run direct via Wimbledon
 2 run circuitously via Richmond
 2 to

Popular culture references
In the British sitcom The Fall and Rise of Reginald Perrin, the station was used as the filming location from which the title character caught his train each morning (with decreasing punctuality). Although Reggie's home town in the series was called Climthorpe, a panning shot of the front of the station in the first episode shows him walking into Norbiton station. (The area remains largely unchanged, with the Frederick W. Paine funeral parlour and the zebra crossing across Coombe Road still in place, although a small number of buildings in front of the main station entrance have since been demolished.) David Nobbs may have thought of Climthorpe as near Norbiton, since various other stations between New Malden and London are named in Reggie's multiple excuses to explain his poor punctuality .

The station also appeared briefly in a 1971 episode of the Rodney Bewes sitcom Dear Mother...Love Albert.

Connections
London Buses routes 57, K2, K3, K4 and K5 serve the station.

References

External links 

Railway stations in the Royal Borough of Kingston upon Thames
Former London and South Western Railway stations
Railway stations in Great Britain opened in 1869
Railway stations served by South Western Railway
1869 establishments in England